David Chu may refer to:

 David Chu (designer), founder of Nautica, a men's designer outerwear company
 David S. C. Chu, former U.S. Under Secretary of Defense for Personnel and Readiness
 David Chu (Hong Kong politician), member of the Legislative Council of Hong Kong and the National People's Congress of the People's Republic of China

See also
 David Chiu (disambiguation)